The Manila East Road, also known as National Road and National Highway, is a two-to-four lane primary and secondary highway connecting Metro Manila to the provinces of Rizal and Laguna in the Philippines.

Since 2014, the entire road is a part of the series of national highways by the Department of Public Works and Highways. It is a component of National Route 60 from Pasig to Cainta, National Route 601 (N601) from Cainta to Famy, while the segment from Famy to Pagsanjan is a component of National Route 602 (N602).

Route description 

Manila East Road starts in barangay Rosario, Pasig as Ortigas Avenue at its intersection with Dr. Sixto Antonio Avenue. It then enters the province of Rizal at Cainta, where it turns south at Cainta Junction towards the poblacion. It enters Taytay, where it meets Taytay Diversion Road near the marketplace. It will then follow a route that circumscribes Laguna de Bay, passing through the municipalities of Angono, Binangonan, Cardona, Morong, Baras, Tanay, and Pililla in Rizal and Mabitac, Famy, Siniloan, Pangil, Pakil, Paete, Kalayaan, Lumban, and Pagsanjan in Laguna.

Alternative names 
Manila East Road is also known as National Road or National Highway. Its section from Rosario, Pasig to Cainta Junction is also known as Rosario–Cainta Road and a part of Ortigas Avenue Extension, while its section from Tanay to Pililla is also known as Tanay–Pililla Road. Its section designated as N602, from Famy to Pagsanjan, forms part of Calamba–Santa Cruz–Famy Junction Road.

The highway is also locally known as the following within respective poblacions:
 Bonifacio Avenue in Cainta
 Rizal Avenue in Taytay
 M.L. Quezon Avenue in Angono
 Baltazar Street and J.P. Rizal Avenue in Binangonan
 San Pedro Street and Rizal Street in Cardona
 T. Claudio Street in Baras
 J.P. Rizal Street in Baras and Pililla
 M.H. Del Pilar Street and F.T. Catapusan Street in Tanay
 G. Paz Street, M.L. Quezon Street, and M.A. Roxas Street in Pililla
 Gen. Taino Street in Pagsanjan

History
The highway used to start in or near Manila and took the present-day alignment of J.P. Rizal Avenue in Makati (formerly part of Rizal), branching off from Santa Ana, Manila, and later the present-day alignments of P. Sanchez Street in Santa Mesa and Shaw Boulevard. It was also designated as part of Highway 21 that linked the city of Manila with the provinces of Rizal and Laguna to the east, especially during the American colonial era.

References

Roads in Rizal
Roads in Laguna (province)
Laguna de Bay
Roads in Metro Manila